Nagathihalli Chandrashekhar is an Indian director, actor, screenwriter and a lyricist who predominantly works in Kannada Cinema. He made his film debut as a screenplay writer in Kadina Benki (1986) which won the National Film Award for Best Feature Film and the Karnataka State Award. His directorial debut was Undu Hoda Kondu Hoda (1991) for which he won the Karnataka State Film Award for Best Story.

Three of his films, Kotreshi Kanasu (1994), America America (1996) and Hoomale (1998) have won National Film Award for Best Feature Film in Kannada.

Career

Filmography

Telefilms

 Directed telefilm on Suggi (Harvest festival) – Telecasted in Bangalore TV station in 1991
 Directed telefilm "Karunalu Baa Belake" – On Buddha's life and message, telecasted in Bangalore TV station in 1992
 Directed telefilm "Avalokana" – Telecasted in Bangalore TV station in 1995
 Directed telefilm "Kavya Saurabha" – Telecasted in Bangalore TV station in 1995
 Screenplay and Dialogues for the teleserials "Kaveri", "Vayyaari", "Aranyadallondu Aragini", "Raaga Lahari"

Mega serials
Mega serials that were telecast in Udaya TV

 Pratibimba
 Kaveri
 Bhagya
 Apartment
 Olave Namma Baduku
 Vataara

Awards

National Film Awards
 1994: Best Feature Film in Kannada — Kotreshi Kanasu
 1996: Best Feature Film in Kannada — America America
 1998: Best Feature Film in Kannada — Hoomale

Karnataka State Film Awards
 1988–89: Best Story Writer — Sankranthi
 1991–92: Best Story Writer — Undu Hoda Kondu Hoda
 1994–95: Special Film of Social Concern — Kotreshi Kanasu
 1996–97: First Best Film — America America
 1996–97: Best Story Writer — America America
 1998–99: Second Best Film — Hoomale
 2002–03: Best Lyricist — Paris Pranaya
 2005–06: Third Best Film — Amrithadhare
 2007–08: Third Best Film — Maathaad Maathaadu Mallige
 2015: Puttanna Kanagal Award

Filmfare Awards South
 2001: Best Director – Kannada — Nanna Preethiya Hudugi
 2003: Best Film – Kannada — Paris Pranaya

Tent Cinema Film School
Nagathihalli Chandrasekhar along with his wife  Shobha Chandrasekhar runs a prominent film school in Bangalore called Tent Cinema, that trains budding actors, directors, filmmakers and film technicians. Apart from him, the faculty includes senior members of the Kannada Film Industry.

References

External links
 Official Website of Nagathihalli Chandrashekhar
 Nagathihalli back to roots
 Official Website of Nagathihalli Film School
 

Kannada film directors
Male actors in Kannada cinema
Indian male film actors
Indian male screenwriters
Indian male short story writers
Kannada-language writers
Kannada-language lyricists
Indian male songwriters
Living people
People from Mandya district
University of Mysore alumni
Filmfare Awards South winners
Screenwriters from Karnataka
Film directors from Karnataka
20th-century Indian dramatists and playwrights
20th-century Indian film directors
21st-century Indian dramatists and playwrights
21st-century Indian film directors
20th-century Indian short story writers
21st-century Indian short story writers
20th-century Indian male writers
21st-century Indian male writers
Recipients of the Rajyotsava Award 2010
1958 births